A Discovery of Witches is a British fantasy television series based on the All Souls Trilogy by Deborah Harkness, named after the first book in the trilogy. Produced by Bad Wolf and Sky Studios, it stars Teresa Palmer and Matthew Goode as a witch and a vampire who must learn about and fend off magical creatures. Edward Bluemel, Louise Brealey, Malin Buska, Aiysha Hart, Owen Teale, Alex Kingston, and Valarie Pettiford are also featured.

The eight-episode first series of A Discovery of Witches premiered weekly in the UK on Sky One from 14 September 2018. In November 2018, Sky One renewed A Discovery of Witches for a second and third series. The ten-episode second series was initially released in its entirety on 8 January 2021, and aired weekly on Sky One. The third and final series was also initially released in its entirety on 7 January 2022 and aired weekly on Sky Max. The programme received generally positive reviews, with praise for the chemistry between the main characters, and it received a nomination for Best New Drama at the National Television Awards.

Premise
Diana Bishop, a historian and reluctant witch, unexpectedly discovers a bewitched manuscript in Oxford's Bodleian Library. This discovery forces her back into the world of magic in order to unravel the secrets it holds about magical beings. She is offered help by a mysterious geneticist and vampire Matthew Clairmont. Despite a long-held mistrust between witches and vampires, they form an alliance and set out to protect the book and solve the mysteries hidden within while dodging threats from the creature world.

Cast and characters

Main
 Teresa Palmer as Diana Bishop, DPhil, a witch and tenured historian at Yale University, studying alchemy and science at the University of Oxford
 Matthew Goode as Matthew Clairmont, a vampire and Professor of Biochemistry
 Edward Bluemel as Marcus Whitmore, Matthew Clairmont's vampire son and lab colleague
 Louise Brealey as Gillian Chamberlain (series 1), a fellow witch and academic alongside Diana at Oxford
 Malin Buska as Satu Järvinen, a Finnish witch and a Congregation member
 Aiysha Hart as Miriam Shephard, vampire and Matthew's scientific colleague at Oxford
 Owen Teale as Peter Knox, a high-ranking witch and a member of the Congregation
 Alex Kingston as Sarah Bishop, Diana's aunt
 Valarie Pettiford as Emily Mather, Sarah's partner
 Gregg Chillin as Domenico Michele, a vampire and Congregation member
 Elarica Johnson as Juliette Durand (series 1), a vampire, daughter of Gerbert
 Greg McHugh as Hamish Osborne, a daemon and friend of Matthew
 Trevor Eve as Gerbert d'Aurillac, an ancient vampire and a Congregation member
 Daniel Ezra as Nathaniel Wilson, a daemon, son of Agatha
 Aisling Loftus as Sophie Wilson, a daemon, wife of Nathaniel, and as Susanna Norman (season 2), a witch
 Tanya Moodie as Agatha Wilson, a daemon and Congregation member
 Sorcha Cusack as Marthe, a vampire, housekeeper to Ysabeau
 Trystan Gravelle (series 1–2) and Peter McDonald (series 3) as Baldwin Montclair, a vampire, brother of Matthew and head of the Congregation.
 Lindsay Duncan as Ysabeau de Clermont, mother of Matthew Clairmont and wife of Philippe de Clermont
 Holly Aird as Françoise (series 2), a vampire
 Tom Hughes as Kit Marlowe (series 2), playwright and friend of Matthew
 Michael Lindall as Walter Raleigh (series 2)
 Sheila Hancock as Goody Alsop (series 2), a witch
 Paul Rhys as Andrew Hubbard (series 2–3), a vampire
 Steven Cree as Gallowglass (series 2–3), son of the late Hugh de Clermont and nephew of Matthew
 Adelle Leonce as Phoebe Taylor (series 2–3), a human who becomes involved with Marcus
 Elaine Cassidy as Louisa de Clermont (series 2), sister of Matthew
 James Purefoy as Philippe de Clermont (series 2), husband of Ysabeau, father of Baldwin and stepfather of Matthew
 Michael Jibson as Rudolf II (series 2), Holy Roman Emperor and King of Bohemia
 Olivier Huband as Fernando Gonçalves (series 3), a vampire, partner of the late Hugh de Clermont
 Jacob Ifan as Benjamin Fuchs (series 3, guest series 2), a vampire
 Ivanno Jeremiah as Christopher Roberts (series 3), friend of Diana
 Toby Regbo as Jack Blackfriars (series 3)
 Joshua Pickering as young Jack Blackfriars (recurring series 2)
 Parker Sawyers as Ransome Fayrweather (series 3), a vampire

Recurring and guest
 Adetomiwa Edun as Sean (series 1), an employee at the Bodleian Library
 Sophia Myles as Rebecca Bishop (series 1–2), Diana's mother
 David Newman as Stephen Proctor (series 1, guest series 2), Diana's father
 Chloe Dumas as Meridiana (series 1), a witch
 Milo Twomey as Pierre (series 2), a vampire
 Barbara Marten as Elizabeth I (series 2), Queen of England
 Adrian Rawlins as William Cecil (series 2)
 Adam Sklar as Henry Percy (series 2)
 Amanda Hale as Mary Sidney (series 2)
 Struan Rodger as John Dee (series 2)
 Anton Lesser as Rabbi Loew (series 2)
 Lois Chimimba as Catherine Streeter (series 2), a witch
 Amy McAllister as Marjorie Cooper (series 2), a witch
 Victoria Yeates as Elizabeth Jackson (series 2), a witch
 Genesis Lynea as Geraldine Newcopse (series 3), a vampire
 Shobu Kapoor as Linda Crosby (series 3), a witch
 Phaldut Sharma as T.J. Weston (series 3), a daemon

Episodes

Series 1 (2018)

Series 2 (2021)

Series 3 (2022)

Production

Warner Bros. purchased the film rights to A Discovery of Witches in 2011. The film was in the early stages of development, with few details released beyond the signing-on of playwright David Auburn to pen the screenplay and producers Denise Di Novi and Allison Greenspan.

British entertainment channel Sky One bought the rights for the books, to adapt them into a television programme. Teresa Palmer was cast as Diana Bishop and Matthew Goode was cast as Matthew Clairmont. After six months of filming, it was completed on 16 February 2018. Much of the work was filmed in Wales, on location and at Bad Wolf Studios in Cardiff.

On 2 November 2018, Sky One renewed A Discovery of Witches for a second and a third series before the first series finale was broadcast. A first look at the second series was released in September 2019. In December 2019, it was announced that the filming for the next series was completed in the UK, and the rest of the filming would take place in Italy. During the New York Comic Con's virtual event in October 2020, it was reported that the third series was filming at Wolf Studios in Cardiff. A trailer for the third series was released in October 2021.

Release 
The programme premiered in the UK on Sky One on 14 September 2018 with its first series of eight episodes. Streaming on NOW TV also started on that date after each episode was broadcast. The international distribution of the programme is handled by Sky Vision. From January 2019, the series became available on AMC's subscription services Sundance Now, Shudder, and AMC Premiere.

It was announced by AMC Networks at the TCA press tour that the show would be making its American television debut on 7 April 2019 on AMC and BBC America, being paired with Killing Eves second season.

The second series was initially released in its entirety on 8 January 2021, consisting of ten episodes, and continued to air weekly on Sky One.

The third series is scheduled to be released on SundanceNow, Shudder and AMC+ on 8 January 2022.

Reception

Critical reception
The programme received positive reviews from critics, who praised the adaptation, the production and the performances of the cast. On Rotten Tomatoes, 94% of 33 critics have given the first series a positive review, with an average rating of 7/10. The website's critical consensus reads, "A Discovery of Witches smartly grounds its flights of fancy with a lived-in authenticity and harnesses the chemistry between its two star-crossed leads to make for a promising foray into the occult." For the second series, Rotten Tomatoes collected 21 critic reviews and identified 81% of them as positive, and the average rating is 6.8/10. The consensus states, "Grounded by Matthew Goode and Teresa Palmer's infectious chemistry and a healthy dose of visual splendor, A Discovery of Witches sophomore season makes slipping eras look easy." Metacritic, another aggregator, assigned the first series an average score of 67 out of 100 based on 13 critics, indicating "generally favorable reviews".

Accolades
In October 2018, A Discovery of Witches was nominated in the longlist for Best New Drama in the National Television Awards. In January 2019, it was announced as a nominee for the shortlist of Best New Drama series nominees at the 24th National Television Awards.

Notes

References

External links
 
  A Discovery of Witches at Sky One
  A Discovery of Witches TV at Deborah Harkness.com (author)
 

2010s British drama television series
2018 British television series debuts
2022 British television series endings
2020s British drama television series
Bodleian Library
British fantasy television series
English-language television shows
Romantic fantasy television series
Sky UK original programming
Television about magic
Television shows set in Oxford
University of Oxford in fiction
Television series about vampires
Television series about witchcraft